Snapguide was an iOS application and website that specializes in user generated step-by-step how-to guides. Users create guides on the site, where community members can comment on, rate, and share guides. It was created by Daniel Raffel and Steve Krulewitz, launching in March 2011. Snapguide is committed to helping people easily share knowledge, tips and tricks, and DIY projects with people who share similar interests.

History
In 2010, while following the Tartine Country Loaf bread recipe, Raffel realized there wasn't an app that let users create step-by-step how to guides in realtime from their mobile devices. After working together at Songbird, Raffel & Krulewitz decided to work on the idea together. They released the first version of their iOS app in March 2011. Snapguide employs a full-time staff of designers and engineers.

They received $10 million in funding as of 2014, from Atlas Venture, Index Ventures, SV Angel, Crunch Fund and Slow Ventures among others.

The original content focused mostly on sharing food recipes. The content has expanded to include a larger array of categories including Tech, Lifestyle, Beauty, Arts & Crafts, and Life Hacks. In June 2015, Lifestyle website Brit + Co acquired Snapguide to bolster DIY empire.

Community
Once signed in, users can follow each other, comment on, like, publish, share and request guides. they can also send personal messages to each other.

Users
Many of Snapguide's users are individuals, ages 18–34, and are interested in DIY and maker content.

Brands also use Snapguide, both as a marketing channel to get in front of their audience, and as a platform to help share unique features of their products with their users.

In the Press
Snapguide has been featured on CNN, Mashable, Techcrunch, The Washington Post, VentureBeat, Lifehacker, CNET, The New York Times, Wired, USA Today, Uncrate, AdWeek, GigaOm, All Things Digital, and Digital Trends among others.

Features
As of February 2014, the iOS app has a number of key features. A user can view guides made by other users in a step-by-step manner. "Profile" is where they can create and see guides they've already published. Snapguide Editors showcase the top and trending content in "Explore." Users can also browse guides in categories in "Topics."  Users can ask the community to create guides on particular topics in "Requests" and browse other popular requests. Once requests are fulfilled, anyone who likes that request is notified. Users monitor the activity of their guides and of users they follow in "Activity."

When creating a guide, users select a title, and then use a combination of photos, videos, and text to help explain how to do what they're teaching, in a clear and understandable step-by-step format. Users can easily upload photos they've taken with their iPhones (or with DSLRs if they use the web editor from a desktop computer).

The web editor went live in November 2013, to allow users to create a guide on the web.

They launched a contest feature in December 2013. Each contest is on a particular theme, and users submit relevant guides to win a variety of prizes. At the end of the contest timeline, judges select winners. Contests are normally sponsored by a partner who promotes the creation of UGC.

Fully functioning embeds launched in February 2014. Users can customize color, shape, and size of the iframe, giving embedded guides a native viewing experience from within 3rd party websites.

References

External links

How-to websites
American social networking websites